Eider Merino Cortazar (born 2 August 1994) is a Spanish professional racing cyclist, who currently rides for UCI Women's Continental Team . Her elder brother Igor Merino is also a professional cyclist, but is currently suspended from the sport.

Major results

2011
 10th Road race, UEC European Junior Road Championships
2014
 1st  Young rider classification Emakumeen Euskal Bira
2015
 3rd La Classique Morbihan
 4th Overall Vuelta a Burgos Feminas
1st Mountains classification
 10th Overall Tour Cycliste Féminin International de l'Ardèche
2016
 3rd Overall Vuelta a Burgos Feminas
 8th Overall Tour Cycliste Féminin International de l'Ardèche
2017
 1st  Overall Vuelta a Burgos Feminas
1st Points classification
 3rd Durango-Durango Emakumeen Saria
 4th Overall Emakumeen Euskal Bira
 10th La Classique Morbihan
2018
 National Road Championships
1st  Road race
2nd Time trial
 3rd Overall Tour Cycliste Féminin International de l'Ardèche
1st Stage 4
 7th Overall Vuelta a Burgos Feminas
1st Mountains classification
 8th Road race, Mediterranean Games
 8th Overall Giro Rosa
 8th La Classique Morbihan
 9th Durango-Durango Emakumeen Saria
2019
 3rd Overall Tour Cycliste Féminin International de l'Ardèche
 4th Overall Setmana Ciclista Valenciana
 5th Emakumeen Nafarroako Klasikoa
 9th Overall Emakumeen Euskal Bira
 9th La Classique Morbihan
 9th Giro dell'Emilia Internazionale Donne Elite
2020
 3rd Road race, National Road Championships
 8th Emakumeen Nafarroako Klasikoa

See also
 List of 2015 UCI Women's Teams and riders

References

External links
 
 

1994 births
Living people
Cyclists from the Basque Country (autonomous community)
Spanish female cyclists
Sportspeople from Biscay
People from Enkarterri